Tandem  is a 1987 French dramatic road movie comedy directed by Patrice Leconte.

Cast 
 Gérard Jugnot : Rivetot
 Jean Rochefort : Michel Mortez
 Sylvie Granotier : Bookseller
 Julie Jézéquel : The waitress
 Jean-Claude Dreyfus : Adviser
 Marie Pillet : Proprietress of 'Hôtel du Commerce'
 Albert Delpy : Driver saw 'Red Dog'

References

External links 

1980s buddy films
1987 comedy films
1987 films
1980s road movies
French comedy films
Films about radio people
French road movies
Films directed by Patrice Leconte
1980s French films